The ninth and final season of CSI: NY originally aired on CBS between September 2012 and February 2013. It is the shortest season of CSI: NY, consisting of only 17 episodes. Its regular time slot on Fridays moved to 8pm/7c for the first two episodes, then back to 9pm/8c beginning with the third episode. On May 10, 2013, CBS canceled the show, making it the second series in the CSI franchise to end.

Episode 15, "Seth and Apep", was the second part of a two-part crossover with CSI: Crime Scene Investigation.

CSI: NY The Ninth Season was released on DVD in the U.S. on June 25, 2013.

Cast

Main cast
Gary Sinise as Mac Taylor
Sela Ward as Jo Danville
Carmine Giovinazzo as Danny Messer
Anna Belknap as Lindsay Messer
Robert Joy as Sid Hammerback
A. J. Buckley as Adam Ross
Hill Harper as Sheldon Hawkes
Eddie Cahill as Don Flack

Recurring cast
Kathleen Munroe as Samantha Flack
Megan Dodds as Christine Whitney
Natalie Martinez as Jamie Lovato

Special guest star
Ted Danson as D.B. Russell

Episodes

References

External links

CSI: NY Season 9 Episode List on Internet Movie Database
CSI: NY Season 9 Episode Guide on CSI Files
CSI: New York on CBS on The Futon Critic

2012 American television seasons
2013 American television seasons
09